Macclesfield is a market town and civil parish in the unitary authority of Cheshire East in Cheshire, England.

Before the Norman Conquest, Macclesfield was held by Edwin, Earl of Mercia and was assessed at £8. The manor is recorded in the Domesday Book as "Maclesfeld", meaning "Maccel's open country". The medieval town grew up on the hilltop around what is now St Michael's Church. It was granted a charter by Edward I in 1261, before he became king. Macclesfield Grammar School was founded in 1502. The town had a silk-button industry from at least the middle of the 17th century and became a major silk-manufacturing centre from the mid-18th century. The Macclesfield Canal was constructed in 1826–31. 

Hovis breadmakers were another Victorian employer. Modern industries include pharmaceuticals. Multiple mill buildings are still standing and several of the town's museums explore the local silk industry. Other landmarks include Georgian buildings such as the Town Hall and former Sunday School; St Alban's Church, designed by Augustus Pugin; and the Arighi Bianchi furniture shop.

The population of Macclesfield at the 2021 census was 57,539. A person from Macclesfield is referred to as a "Maxonian".

Toponymy
Situated in the ancient Hundred of Hamestan, the town is recorded in the Domesday Book as "Maclesfeld" and in 1183 it was referred to as "Makeslesfeld". The English Place-Name Society gives its name as being derived from the Old English name, Maccel, and field, yielding the meaning "Maccel's open country".

Although "Silk Town" seems to be its preferred nickname, the traditional nickname of Macclesfield is "Treacle Town".
This refers to an historical incident when a horse-drawn wagon overturned and spilt its load of treacle onto the street, after which the poor scooped the treacle off the road.

History
Before the Norman Conquest, Macclesfield was held by Edwin, Earl of Mercia, who also held much of the east of the county. Three crosses survive from this period, originally located in Sutton, and J. D. Bu'Lock speculates that there might have been a Pre-Conquest church. The area was devastated by the Normans in 1070, and had not recovered by 1086; the Domesday Book records the manor as having fallen in value from £8 to 20 shillings. Hugh d'Avranches, Earl of Chester held the manor himself after the Conquest; there was a mill, meadow for oxen, and woodland 6 leagues by 4 leagues. A Norman castle was built at Macclesfield. Macclesfield was granted a borough charter by Ranulf de Blondeville, Earl of Chester, in the early 13th century, and in 1261 a second charter was granted by the future King Edward I, allowing a market, fair and judicial court. The medieval town stood on the hilltop, centred on the parish church of All Saints, which was built in 1278, an extension of a chapel built in approximately 1220. In 1357, a hall was built in the town for the mayor's court and the borough court (portmote). The town lacked industries at this date and was described as poor, remaining a small market town until the end of the 15th century, with a population numbered in the hundreds.

The Cheshire archers were a body of elite soldiers noted for their skills with the longbow that fought in many engagements in Britain and France in the Middle Ages. Battles at which there were sizeable numbers of Cheshire archers include Agincourt and Crecy. In 1277 Edward I employed 100 of these archers from the Macclesfield area as his personal bodyguard, his successor Richard II also employed a bodyguard of these yeoman archers who came from the Macclesfield Hundred and the forest districts of Cheshire.

The borough had a weekly market and two annual fairs: the Barnaby fair on St Barnabas day (11 June), the other on the feast of All Souls (2 November). In recent years the Barnaby fair has been reinvented as the Barnaby Festival, a cultural festival in mid-June. The weekly market no longer happens but on the last Sunday of each month the Treacle Market is held, a large market selling locally produced food and handmade items such as clothing, handmade goods and pottery.

Macclesfield was the administrative centre of the Hundred of Macclesfield, which occupied most of east Cheshire. The Earl of Chester's manor of Macclesfield was very large, and its boundary extended to Disley. The manor house was on the edge of the deer park, on the west of the town. In the 14th century, it had a king's chamber and a queen's hall, as well as a large stable, and the manor served as a stud farm for Edward the Black Prince. The Earls of Chester established the Forest of Macclesfield, which was much larger than its present-day namesake. It was used for hunting deer and pasturing sheep and cattle. By the end of the 13th century, large areas of the forest had been ploughed because of the pressure of population growth. In 1356, two trees from the forest were given to archer William Jauderell to repair his home.

Macclesfield Castle was a fortified town house built by John de Macclesfield in the later Middle Ages. Construction began in 1398, and that year an application was made for a licence to crenellate, or fortify, the building. Two chantries were founded in the town: one in 1422 by the Legh family, and one in 1504 by Thomas Savage. In 1502, Macclesfield Grammar School was founded by Sir John Percyvale.

No proof exists that Macclesfield was ever a walled town. When the settlement was first established and for some centuries afterwards there would have certainly been some sort of ditch and palisade round the western side of the town which was not naturally defended.  This was necessary in order to keep out undesirable people and stray animals.  No physical trace of a ditch remains though measurements and the shape of certain streets suggest where such a ditch could have been and most of the medieval building were within this area.  It is unlikely that the ditch and palisade were succeeded by a wall for no record has been found of a murage tax, which would certainly have been levied to keep the wall in repair.  The suffix "Gate" in the names of several Macclesfield streets has been taken to indicate the former presence of a gate in the sense of a guarded opening in a wall, however, this is very unlikely as the term 'gate' is derived from 'gata', Scandinavian for road, which became gate in Middle English. Therefore, Chester Gate, the Jordan Gate and the Church Wall Gate (some sources give the name Well Gate for this gate), are simply referring to the road to/from Chester or the road leading from the church to the well. These names are preserved in the names of three streets in the town, Chestergate, Jordangate and Back Wallgate.

A charter of 1595 established a town governing body consisting of the mayor, two aldermen and 24 "capital burgesses", and the powers of this body were increased by a charter of 1684. By the Tudor era, Macclesfield was prospering, with industries including the manufacture of harnesses, gloves and especially buttons, and later ribbons, tapes and fancy ware. Coal was mined from the 16th century. In 1664, the population was around 2,600, making Macclesfield the third-largest town in the county, after Chester and Nantwich, although the town had expanded little from its medieval extent and had fewer large houses than Nantwich and Stockport. By around 1720, the number of households had increased to 925, and this rapid population growth continued throughout the 18th century, reaching 8,743 in 1801.

In the 1580s, Macclesfield was one of the earliest towns in the county to have Puritan preaching "Exercises", and it was also an early centre for the Quakers. By 1718 an estimated 10% of the population was Nonconformist. Towards the end of that century, the town had a large Methodist congregation, and Christ Church was the only Anglican church in the county to invite John Wesley to preach.

During the Civil War, in 1642 the town was occupied for the King by Sir Thomas Aston, a Royalist. In the Jacobite Rising of 1745, Charles Stuart and his army marched through Macclesfield as they attempted to reach London. The mayor was forced to welcome the prince, and the event is commemorated in one of the town's silk tapestries.

The population was 24,137 by 1841.

Armoury Towers was completed in 1858 and the Bridge Street drill hall was completed in 1871.

Industry

Macclesfield was once the world's biggest producer of finished silk. A domestic button industry had been established in the town by the mid-16th century, although the first mention of silk buttons is not until 1649. In the mid-18th century, when metal buttons became fashionable, the silk-button industry transitioned to silk manufacture in mills. Macclesfield's first silk mill was founded by Charles Roe in 1743 or 1744. The mills were initially powered by water, and later by steam. There were 71 silk mills operating in 1832, employing 10,000 people, but a crash occurred in 1851 and many mill-workers emigrated to the American silk town of Paterson, New Jersey. The silk industry remained active in the town in the 1980s, but no longer dominated. Paradise Mill reopened in 1984 as a working mill museum, demonstrating the art of silk throwing and Jacquard weaving. The four Macclesfield Museums display a range of information and products from that period.

A short-lived copper-smelting operation was established by Roe in 1750, processing ore from mines at Alderley Edge and Ecton (Staffordshire), and later from Anglesey. The business switched to copper processing and the manufacture of brass in 1767, before closing after Roe's death in 1781. The industry is reflected in some of the town's street names.

Between 1826 and 1831 the Macclesfield Canal was constructed, linking Macclesfield to Marple to the north and Kidsgrove to the south. The canal was surveyed for its Act of Parliament by the canal and roads engineer Thomas Telford, and built by William Crosley (junior), the Macclesfield Canal Company's engineer. It was the last narrow canal to be completed and had only limited success because within ten years much of the coal and other potential cargo was increasingly being transported by rail.

Macclesfield is the original home of Hovis breadmakers, produced in Publicity Works Mill (commonly referred to as "the Hovis Mill") on the canal close to Buxton Road. It was founded by a Macclesfield businessman and a baker from Stoke-on-Trent. Hovis is said to derive from the Latin "homo-vitalis" (strength for man) as a way of providing a cheap and nutritious food for poor mill workers and was a very dry and dense wholemeal loaf completely different from the modern version.

Waters Green was once home to a nationally known horse market which features in the legend of the Wizard of Alderley Edge.
Waters Green and an area opposite Arighi Bianchi, now hidden under the Silk Road, also held a sheep and cattle market until the 1980s.

Macclesfield is said to be the only mill town to have escaped bombing in World War II. After the war, two pharmaceutical companies opened facilities in Macclesfield, Geigy (now part of Novartis) and the pharmaceutical division of ICI (now AstraZeneca).

Governance
Macclesfield was first represented in Parliament after the Reform Act of 1832, when it was granted two Members of Parliament (MPs).  This situation lasted until 1880, when after problems at the general election that year it was decided to declare the election void and suspend the writ of election (so no by-election could take place). In September 1880 a Royal Commission was appointed to investigate further. A report of March 1881 confirmed the allegations of corruption. As a result, the borough constituency was disenfranchised for corruption. The disenfranchisement took effect on 25 June 1885, when the town was transferred to the East Cheshire constituency. However under the Redistribution of Seats Act 1885 the Macclesfield constituency was recreated with extended boundaries, as a county division, later in 1885. From the 1885 general election it has elected one MP. Macclesfield was for some time considered to be a safe seat for the Conservative Party, having been held by it since the 1918 general election, but the 2017 election showed a significant swing away from the Conservatives.

Currently, Macclesfield is represented by David Rutley, a Conservative and practising Mormon. He was selected for this seat in 2010, when Sir Nicholas Winterton, who had been the incumbent for 38 years, announced his retirement following unfavourable press coverage relating to the claiming of Parliamentary expenses. Sir Nicholas' wife, Ann Winterton, held the neighbouring seat of Congleton.

Macclesfield was governed locally by Macclesfield Municipal Borough (see Macclesfield (borough)) until 1974 when Macclesfield Borough Council was established, a local government district with borough status. Following the establishment of Cheshire East Council in 2009 the borough was abolished and the Mayoralty transferred to charter trustees. Macclesfield Town Council was established in 2015 following a community governance review which established a civil parish. Macclesfield Town Council is controlled by the Labour Party, with 9 councillors. There are 3 Independent councillors, and no Conservatives.

Macclesfield is also represented by 12 councillors on Cheshire East Council: 9 Labour, 3 Independents.

Geography

Macclesfield is in the east of Cheshire, on the River Bollin, a tributary of the River Mersey. It is close to the county borders of Greater Manchester to the north, Derbyshire to the east and Staffordshire to the south. It is near the towns of Stockport to the north, Buxton to the east, and Congleton to the south. It is 38 miles (60 km) to the east of Chester, the county town of Cheshire.

To the west of the town lies the Cheshire Plain. To the east is Macclesfield Forest, containing Ridgegate and Trentabank Reservoirs which supply the town's drinking water, as well as Tegg's Nose and the Peak District.

The Macclesfield Built-up Area forms an urban area which extends from the town to an area that includes the town of Bollington and the village of Prestbury. The urban area has a population of 63,954.

According to the 2011 census, the gender makeup of the population was 31,266 male and 32,688 female. The ethnic makeup of the whole urban area was under 96.2% white and 2.2% Asian. Other ethnic minorities were 1.6%. The religious make up of the whole area includes: 66.3% Christian, 0.5% Muslim, 24.8% Irreligious and 6.8% not stated.

Climate
Like most of the United Kingdom, Macclesfield has a temperate maritime climate (Köppen: Cfb). Records of the climate extend back to at least 1850. Between 1881 and 2005, the highest temperature has been  on 3 August 1990 and the lowest, from at least 1850–2005,  on 25 December 1860.

Landmarks

The town is famous for its once thriving silk industry, commemorated in the Silk Museum. The Georgian Town Hall was designed by Francis Goodwin in 1823. Macclesfield is home to an Augustus Pugin church, St Alban's on Chester Road.

Economy

Macclesfield is the manufacturing home to AstraZeneca, one of the world's largest pharmaceutical companies. The furniture store Arighi Bianchi was founded in 1829. Other industries include textiles, light engineering, paper and plastics.

Transport

Railway
Macclesfield station is on the Stafford to Manchester branch of the West Coast Main Line. Avanti West Coast operates generally hourly services to Manchester Piccadilly (20 minutes away), Stoke-on-Trent (15 minutes) and London Euston (1 hour 47 minutes); services to Birmingham New Street, Reading and beyond are provided by CrossCountry. Northern Trains' hourly stopping service between Manchester and Stoke-on-Trent calls at Macclesfield.

A railway station was first opened at Beech Lane by the LNWR on 19 June 1849, which was replaced a month later by Hibel Road station. The current station dates from the modernisation of the West Coast Main Line in the mid-1960s, when the old station buildings were demolished to make way for new buildings.

Buses
Macclesfield has a bus station located within the town centre. The original building opened on Sunderland Street, just outside the railway station; it was replaced in 2004, when a new bus station opened on Queen Victoria Street.

The principal operators around Macclesfield are Arriva North West and two subsidiaries of Centrebus Group: D&G Bus and High Peak Buses.

There are around 15 bus routes in Macclesfield that run within the town or surrounding towns such as Congleton, Wilmslow and Knutsford. Other locations that are served from Macclesfield include Stockport, Crewe, Buxton, Altrincham, Wythenshawe and Chatsworth House. Buses in the town run Monday to Saturday; the only service that runs on a Sunday is High Peak route 58 to Chatsworth House.

Roads
Macclesfield is served by good road links from the north, south and west, but has fewer roads going east due to the terrain of the Peak District. From the south, access from Congleton and the Potteries is from the A536, and via the A523 from Leek. From the north, the main access to the town is the A523 from Manchester, Hazel Grove and Poynton. The main west–east road is the A537 Knutsford to Buxton road. At various points around the town centre, some of these roads combine, such as the A537 / A523 on the Silk Road section, giving rise to traffic congestion, especially at peak times. The A538 provides access to Prestbury, Wilmslow and Manchester Airport, with the B5470 being the only other eastbound route from the town, heading to Whaley Bridge and Chapel-en-le-Frith.

Culture

Macclesfield has been accused of having few cultural amenities. In 2004, research was published in The Times naming Macclesfield and its borough the most uncultured town in Britain, based on its lack of theatres, cinemas and other cultural facilities.

The Northern Chamber Orchestra, the oldest professional chamber ensemble in the North West, has its home at the Macclesfield Heritage Centre and presents a series of eight concerts a year, attracting international guest soloists. The Silk Opera Company was created to perform 'The Monkey Run' at Barnaby.

After recent rationalisation, the town now has one museum - the Silk Museum on Park Lane, which includes paid access to Paradise Mill, a former silk mill. The Silk Museum houses the Ancient Egyptian artefacts brought back by Victorian antiquarian Marianne Brocklehurst and her partner Mary Booth: these were formerly held in West Park Museum, as well as a number of art galleries.

The Macclesfield Model Railway Group is nationally recognised as a leading railway modelling club, known for many layouts since its foundation in 1957.

The 'Macclesfield Literary and Philosophical Society' was formed in 2006, partly in response to The Times 2004 article.

Local newspapers include the Macclesfield Express and the Community News. Macclesfield residents have access to Macclesfield Forum, an online message board, for informal discussion of local news and issues. The town is also served by two locally based radio stations: Canalside Community Radio based at the Clarence Mill in Bollington, just north of Macclesfield, and Cheshire's Silk 106.9, a commercial independent radio station with studios in the town. Local information websites include Visit Macclesfield and the local what's on guide, Canalside's The Thread.

The last remaining commercial cinema in Macclesfield closed in 1997. Discussions have taken place regarding the possibility of building a multiplex cinema, but attempts to build a cinema have thus far been unsuccessful. In 2005 a small-scale cinema, Cinemac, was set up in the Heritage Centre, which has since become well established; also based in the Heritage Centre is the Silk Screen arts cinema, which gives fortnightly screenings of art-house films.

Amateur dramatics is well represented in the town: the Macclesfield Amateur Dramatic Society has existed since 1947 and performs in its own theatre on Lord Street.  The Macclesfield Majestic Theatre Group has been producing musicals since its inception in 1971, initially at the Majestic Theatre (hence the title), but latterly at various other locations after the theatre was converted into a public house by the new tenants. Most recently, shows have been produced at the Heritage Centre, the Evans Theatre in Wilmslow and MADS Theatre on Lord Street. Several members of this society have progressed to the professional stage, most notably Marshall Lancaster and Jonathan Morris.

Gawsworth Hall hosts an annual Shakespeare festival as well as many arts and music events throughout the year.

There is a Popworld nightspot, rated as the "absolute worst place in the region" by Lonely Planet.

Macclesfield has appeared in film: it was used as the location for Sir John Mills's film So Well Remembered in 1947. Some of the locations are still recognisable, such as Hibel Road. A fictionalised version of Macclesfield's railway station appeared in the 2005 football hooliganism film Green Street. It was also the location of Control (2007), a film about Ian Curtis, the lead singer of Joy Division.

The blues singer John Mayall was born in the town in 1933. Macclesfield was also the home town of Ian Curtis and Stephen Morris of Joy Division, and Gillian Gilbert who, along with Morris, was a member of New Order. A memorial to Curtis is located at Macclesfield Crematorium. Other Macclesfield acts to have gained recognition include The Macc Lads and Marion. Silk Brass Band, the Macclesfield-based brass band, won the National Championship of Great Britain Third Section Final in 2002. Having been promoted from the third section in 2002, they have since consistently competed in the Second, First and Championship sections of the UK's brass band grading system. Local band the Virginmarys has achieved national and international success and chart-topping UK band The 1975 come from Macclesfield.

In literature, Macclesfield is the second principal location of the fantasy novels The Weirdstone of Brisingamen and The Moon of Gomrath by Alan Garner.

In 2008, the borough was named as the fifth happiest of 273 districts in Britain by researchers from the universities of Sheffield and Manchester, who used information on self-reported personal well-being from the British Household Panel Survey.

Education
Macclesfield is served by four state-funded academies (previously state high schools); Tytherington School, The Macclesfield Academy, Fallibroome Academy and All Hallows Catholic College.

There is also an independent school, Beech Hall School.

Macclesfield Academy is made up of pupils from the former school Henbury High School, and also took in the pupils left over when Ryles Park secondary school closed in 2004. Ryles Park had been in turn an amalgamation of Ryles Park girls school and the oldest state school in the town, Macclesfield Central boys school, which closed in 1975. It is on the site of Macclesfield College and Park Lane Special School as part of the Macclesfield 'Learning Zone', which was opened in 2007. Macclesfield High School was the name originally given to the girls grammar school on Fence Avenue which formed part of the King's School.

Religion
 
The hilltop church of St Michael and All Angels has views of nearby Kerridge Hill. The church is approached from Waters Green by a flight of 108 steps, which themselves are a local landmark.

Macclesfield Sunday School started in 1796 as a non-denominational Sunday School in Pickford Street, which catered for 40 children. It was founded by John Whitaker whose objective was "to lessen the sum of human wretchedness by diffusing religious knowledge and useful learning among the lower classes of society". Though chapels set up their denominational schools, the Sunday School committee in 1812 elected to erect a purpose-built school on Roe Street. The Big Sunday School had 1,127 boys and 1,324 girls on its books when it opened.

St Alban's Church in Chester Road is an active Roman Catholic parish church.  The church is recorded in the National Heritage List for England as a designated Grade II* listed building.  It was designed by A. W. N. Pugin.

Christ Church is a brick-built redundant Anglican church, located on Great King Street.  It is recorded in the National Heritage List for England as a designated Grade II* listed building, and is under the care of the Churches Conservation Trust.  The church was in use until 1981.  It remains consecrated and is used occasionally for services.

There is a Mormon church located on Victoria Road.

Other churches of architectural merit include:
 King Edward Street Chapel, Macclesfield
 St George's Church, Macclesfield
 St Paul's Church, Macclesfield
 St Peter's Church, Macclesfield
 Holy Trinity Church, Hurdsfield
 Macclesfield United Reformed Church

Sport and leisure

Football

Macclesfield's professional football club, Macclesfield Town, first gained league status in 1997 as Football Conference Champions; they had won that title two years earlier but were denied promotion as their Moss Rose stadium in the south of the town failed to meet Football League stadium capacity requirements. At the end of the 2019–20 season, the Silkmen were relegated from EFL League Two. In September 2020, Macclesfield Town Football Club was wound up in the High Court over debts totalling more than £500,000.

Macclesfield F.C.
On 13 October 2020, the Official Receiver confirmed that the assets of Macclesfield Town had been sold to Macc Football Club Limited. Local businessman Robert Smethurst had purchased the assets, and rebranded the club as Macclesfield F.C., they currently play in the Northern Premier League(Division One West).

Other football clubs
Youth football teams include Macclesfield Juniors FC, Macclesfield Saints JFC, Moss Rose Juniors FC and Tytherington Juniors.

Other sports

Macclesfield RUFC, the town's rugby union club, plays in National League 1, following promotion from National League 2 North in the 2013–14 season.

Macclesfield Chess Club is one of the oldest chess clubs in the country having been founded in 1886.

Macclesfield's cycling club Macclesfield Wheelers is a local club for all cycling activities, from pleasure riding to racing. World-famous cyclist Reg Harris produced "Reg Harris" bikes in Macclesfield for three years during the 1960s. The local cycling campaign group is known as MaccBUG (Macclesfield Borough Bicycle Users Group). Formed in 1999, it campaigns for better cycling provision for leisure and utility cyclists.

Macclesfield Harriers & Athletic Club is an active club with over 500 members. The club caters for all abilities and ages. There are sections for road running, track & field, fell running and cross country.

Macclesfield Hockey Club is a community club with 8 senior teams and a thriving junior section. They cater for players of all abilities from the age of 5 upwards. At the first team level, the Ladies play in the Regional North Leagues and the men in the North West Hockey Premier League.

In December 2006, Sport England published a survey which revealed that residents of Macclesfield were the third-most active in England in sports and other fitness activities; 29.3% of the population participate at least three times a week for 30 minutes.

Macclesfield parkrun, a free weekly timed 5k run, takes place in South Park every Saturday morning at 9.00am.

Notable people

Politicians 
 John Brocklehurst  DL, MP (1788–1870) Head of a family of silk producers, banker and MP for Macclesfield for 36 years from 1832 to 1868.
 William Coare Brocklehurst (1818–1900) English Liberal Party politician. Son of John and his successor as MP (1868–80).  Unseated after a complaint of bribery during the 1880 election which caused the borough to lose its representation in Westminster; son William (1851–1933)
 David Chadwick (1821–1895) English accountant and Liberal Party politician. One of two MP's for Macclesfield from 1868 to 1880 when unseated and then convicted of bribery and of making a false return of election expenses
 William Brocklehurst Brocklehurst (1851–1929) businessman and Liberal Party MP for Macclesfield from 1906 to 1918
 Sir Walter Bromley-Davenport TD DL, Kt. (1903–1989) Conservative MP for Knutsford from 1945 until 1970

Public service 

 Blessed John Shert (c.1544–1582) English Catholic priest and martyr, executed during the reign of Elizabeth I, beatified in 1889.
 Rev David Simpson, M.A. (1745–1799) Anglican priest who spent most of his career in Macclesfield
 William Buckley, (1780–1856) escaped convict, survived among Australian aborigines between 1803 and 1835, raised here.
 John Charles Ryle (1816–1900) was the first Anglican Bishop of Liverpool
 Thomas Mottershead (c.1825 – 1884) British trade unionist and socialist activist
 Herbert Philips (c.1835–1905) philanthropist and justice of the peace
 Sir Samuel Rowe KCMG (1835–1888) doctor and colonial administrator of Sierra Leone, the Gambia and Gold Coast
 Arthur Smith Woodward, (1864–1944) palaeontologist specialising in fossil fish, was born and educated here
 Richard Crosse DSO & Bar (1888–1970) distinguished British Army officer
 Vera Brittain (1893–1970) nurse, writer, feminist and pacifist, lived in Macclesfield as a child
 Edward Brittain MC (1895 in Macclesfield – 1918) British Army officer, fought and died in WW1 and was immortalised by his sister Vera Brittain in Testament of Youth
 Percy Wragg Brian FRS FRSE CBE (1910–1979) British botanist and mycologist, developed natural antibiotics
 Alec Stokes, (1919–2003) scientist worked on X-ray crystallography and DNA was born here.
 Christine Mary Tacon CBE (born 1959) the United Kingdom's Groceries Code Adjudicator
 Tony Pollard (born 1965) archaeologist, specialising in the archaeology of conflict

Commerce 

 Charles Roe (1715–1781) industrialist, helped establish the silk industry in Macclesfield
 James Pigot (1769–1843) British publisher of directories, and a pioneering publisher of trade directories
 John Birchenough JP (1825–1895) silk manufacturer in the town and local politiciand 
 Sir Thomas Wardle (1831–1909) businessman, known for his innovations in silk dyeing and printing on silk
 William Ryle II (1834–1881) silk manufacturer
 Sir John Henry Birchenough, 1st Baronet, GCMG (1853–1937) English businessman and public servant.
Peter Gaddum (1902–1986) was the sole provider of raw silk to the UK during much of World War II

The Arts 

 Alfred Gatley (1816–1863) was an English sculptor
 John William Wadsworth (1879–1955), ceramics designer for Mintons, born in Macclesfield
 Mabel Frances Layng (1881–1937) English landscape and figure painter
 Charles Tunnicliffe OBE, RA (1901–1979) naturalistic painter of British birds and other wildlife; born in the village of Langley
 Kika Markham (born 1940) English actress, widow of Corin Redgrave
 Sarah Burton OBE (born 1974) fashion designer, creative director of fashion brand Alexander McQueen
 Helen Marten, (born 1985) sculptor who won the Turner Prize and the inaugural Hepworth Prize
Robert Longden (born 1951) composer, librettist, director, film, stage and television actor

Journalists and writers 

 Hester Rogers (1756–1794) British Methodist writer and role model for women Methodists
 Sui Sin Far (born Edith Maude Eaton; 1865–1914) author, wrote about Chinese people in North America
 Joseph McCabe, (1867–1955) rationalist writer and critic of religion, was born here
 Brian Redhead, (1929–1993) Manchester Guardian journalist and BBC Radio 4 Today anchorman, lived in the town
 Sir Andreas Whittam Smith, CBE (born 1937) financial journalist, founded and edited The Independent newspaper in 1986
 Michael Jackson (born 1958) television producer and executive, was Controller of both BBC One and BBC Two and Chief Executive of Channel 4, between 1997 and 2001
 Peter Stanford (born 1961) writer, editor, journalist, presenter, known for biographies and writings on religion and ethics
 Nick Robinson, (born 1963) was political editor for the BBC, now presenter of the Today programme
 Stuart Evers (born 1976) novelist, short story writer and critic.

Music 

 Forbes Robinson (1926–1987) bass, known for his performances in works by Mozart, Verdi, and Britten.
 John Mayall OBE (born 1933) blues musician and bandleader, influential in the British blues movement
 Noddy Holder (born 1946) lead singer of Slade, lives in the town.
 Ian Curtis (1956–1980) lead singer of Joy Division, lived and died there.  He is buried in the Macclesfield cemetery.
 Stephen Morris (born 1957) drummer in the bands Joy Division, New Order, The Other Two & Bad Lieutenant
 Gillian Gilbert (born 1961) musician, keyboardist, guitarist, singer, member of New Order,  founding member of The Other Two
 Andy Carthy (born 1972) known by his stage name Mr. Scruff, record producer and DJ
 Phil Cunningham (born 1974 in Macclesfield) guitarist, member of the bands Marion, New Order and Bad Lieutenant
 Jim Moray (born 1981) folk musician, born in Macclesfield
 The Macc Lads (active 1981 – present) rock band 
 The Other Two (active 1990–2011) an English dance act consisting of Stephen Morris and Gillian Gilbert of New Order 
 Marion (formed in 1993) Brit-Pop band 
 Hatty Keane (born 1994) r&b and pop singer
 The Virginmarys (formed in 2009) rock band.

TV personalities 
 Michael Richard Jackson (born 1958) is a British television producer and executive
 Mr Methane (born 1963 in Macclesfield) as Paul Oldfield, the world's only currently performing flatulist
 Dominic Brunt (born 1970) actor, played vet Paddy Kirk in ITV's Emmerdale 
 Geoff Lloyd (born 1973) radio DJ, also known as the Geoff half of Pete And Geoff; Hometime show on Absolute Radio.
 Marshall Lancaster (born 1974) actor, played DC Chris Skelton in the BBC dramas Life on Mars and Ashes to Ashes

Sport 

 Joseph Hawcridge (1863 in Macclesfield – 1905) a rugby union footballer
 Linton Hope (1863–1920) sailor, competed at the 1900 Summer Olympics in Meulan, France
 Reg Harris OBE (1920–1992) track cyclist, active in the 1940s, 1950s and 1970s.
 Guy Edwards (born 1942 in Macclesfield) Formula One driver
(1974-1977)
 Bobbie van de Graaf (born 1944 in Macclesfield) retired Dutch rower, bronze medalist in the 1964 Summer Olympics
 Chris Nicholl (born 1946) former Northern Ireland international footballer, over 600 pro appearances, coach and manager
 Jonathan Agnew MBE (born 1960) cricketer and cricket commentator
 Peter Moores (born 1962) former England Cricket Coach, born and schooled in Macclesfield.
 Stuart Brown (born 1972) thirteen-time British National Sidecarcross Champion.
 Steven Mellor (born 1973) swimmer, competed in the 1992 Olympic Games in Barcelona
 Jamie Donaldson (born 1975) golfer, born in and plays for Wales, was raised and currently lives in the town
 Sir Ben Ainslie CBE (born 1977) Olympic gold medal-winning yachtsman, born in the town
 Peter Crouch (born 1981) Burnley F.C. and England international football player.
 Vicky Jepson, association football manager
 Izzy Christiansen (born 1991) English women footballer
 Matthew Nottingham (born 1992) badminton player
 Emily Whitlock (born 1994) a professional squash player, world No. 12 in 2017.

Twin towns
Macclesfield has no twin towns. Until 2010, Macclesfield had an informal bond with Eckernförde in Germany in the aftermath of World War II when the townsfolk sent aid to Eckernförde.

Freedom of the Town
The following people and military units have received the Freedom of the Town of Macclesfield.

Individuals
 John Askey: 9 August 2018.

See also

 Listed buildings in Macclesfield
 Cat and Fiddle Road
 Macclesfield Castle
 Armoury Towers
 List of textile mills in Cheshire
 Duke's Court (Macclesfield)
Macclesfield group power stations

Notes and references

Footnotes

Notes

Bibliography
 Beck, J. (1969). Tudor Cheshire. A History of Cheshire Vol. 7 (J. J. Bagley, ed.) (Cheshire Community Council)
 Bu'Lock, J. D. (1972). Pre-Conquest Cheshire: 383–1066. A History of Cheshire Vol. 3 (J. J. Bagley, ed.) (Cheshire Community Council)
 
 
 Driver, J. T. (1971). Cheshire in the Later Middle Ages. A History of Cheshire Vol. 6 (J. J. Bagley, ed.) (Cheshire Community Council)
 Hartwell, C., Hyde, M., Hubbard, E., Pevsner, N. (2011). The Buildings of England: Cheshire (2nd edn) (Yale University Press)
 Hewitt, H. J. (1967). Cheshire under the Three Edwards. A History of Cheshire Vol. 5 (J. J. Bagley, ed.) (Cheshire Community Council)
 Hodson, J. H. (1978). Cheshire, 1660–1780: Restoration to Industrial Revolution. A History of Cheshire Vol. 9 (J. J. Bagley, ed.) (Cheshire Community Council)
 Husain, B. M. C. (1973). Cheshire under the Norman Earls: 1066–1237. A History of Cheshire Vol. 4 (J. J. Bagley, ed.) (Cheshire Community Council) 
 
Tigwell, R. E. (1985). Cheshire in the Twentieth Century. A History of Cheshire Vol. 12 (J. J. Bagley, ed.) (Cheshire Community Council)

 
Market towns in Cheshire
Towns and villages of the Peak District
Towns in Cheshire